Bhoy ( fear) is a 1996 Bengali thriller film directed by Chiranjit Chakraborty. This movie was released in 1996 in the banner of Dipabali Chitram. This film was loosely based on Hindi thriller film Agnisakshi which itself is based on the English movie Sleeping with the Enemy. Music direction was made by Anupam Dutta and Kabir Suman. The songs of the movie were written by Shibdas Bandyopadhyay and Lakshmikanta Roy.

Plot
Jaya was compelled to marry the ruthless and criminal Ranjit. Ranjit regularly abuses her physically and mentally. She tries to free herself from her husband but cannot succeed. When Jaya discovers that Ranjit and Jagmohan are involved with immoral trafficking and smuggling, she flies to find refuge in reporter Pallab's house. But Jagmohan identifies her residing with Pallab and informs Ranjit. Ranjit plans to sell Jaya to Jagamohan and remarry. One day their henchmen kidnap Jaya, killing her friend Samir. Pallab follows them and after a sudden fight rescues her from their den.

Cast
 Chiranjit Chakraborty as Pallab
 Debashree Roy as Jaya
 Shankar Chakraborty as Samir
 Soumitra Bannerjee as Ranjit
 Dulal Lahiri as Jagamohan
 Subhasish Mukhopadhyay as Pallab's friend
 Satya Bandyopadhyay as Jaya's father
 Chitra Sen as Jaya's mother

References

External links
 

1996 films
Bengali-language Indian films
Indian crime thriller films
1990s Bengali-language films
Bengali remakes of Hindi films
1996 crime thriller films
Films scored by Anupam Dutta